The State of the Union address, also known as the State of the European Union  or SOTEU, is the annual speech addressed by the President of the European Commission to the European Parliament plenary session in September. The State of the Union address of the European Union was instituted by the Lisbon Treaty (with the 2010 Framework Agreement on relations between the European Parliament and the European Commission - Annex IV(5)), in order to make political life of the Union more democratic and transparent than it previously had been.

The Framework Agreement thus also foresees that the President of the European Commission sends a letter of intent to the President of the European Parliament and the Presidency of the Council of the European Union that sets out in detail the actions the European Commission intends to take by means of legislation and other initiatives until the end of the following year. The address is then followed by a plenary debate  on the political situation of the Union, the so-called State of the Union debate.

History

José Manuel Barroso 

The first State of the Union speech of the European Union was pronounced on 7 September 2010 by President José Manuel Barroso. There he dealt mainly with the economic situation and unemployment issues;

In Barroso's second address, on 28 September 2011, he called for a eurozone bond and a financial transactions tax to stem the eurozone crisis and came out against the Franco-German proposal for an intergovernmental economic eurozone government - stating that that role belonged to the Commission;

In Barroso's third address, on 12 September 2012, he called for a "decisive deal to complete the EMU", by which he meant a new European treaty to "move towards a Federation of nation states", ahead of the European Parliamentary election in 2014.

He also acknowledged the need for "a serious discussion between the citizens of Europe about the way forward", calling in particular on all pro-European forces to be mobilised against the anti-European agenda of "the populists and the nationalists".

Jean-Claude Juncker 

9 September 2015 marked the first address held by Jean-Claude Juncker. It was titled "Time for honesty, unity and solidarity" and opened with the "imperative to act as a union" in order to address the refugee crisis.

Juncker used his 2017 State of the Union address to call for "a stronger single market".

Ursula von der Leyen

In 2020, on Brexit, Ursula von der Leyen restated the withdrawal agreement is an agreed and ratified divorce agreement:

Her 2021 address has been delivered on 15 September 2021:

References

Further reading

External links
 Transcript of the 2010 address
 Transcript of the 2011 address
 Video of the 2011 address
 Press review of the 2011 address
 Transcript of the 2012 address
 Transcript of the 2013 address
 Transcript of the 2015 address
 State of the Union 2015 (includes full speech, speech transcript, letter of intent, closing remarks, Report on Progress on the European Commission's 10 Priorities)
 State of the Union 2016
 State of the Union 2017
 State of the Union 2018
 State of the Union 2020
 State of the Union 2021
 State of the Union 2022

European Parliament
European Commission
Politics of the European Union
State ritual and ceremonies
Annual events in Europe